Strange To Explain is the eleventh studio album by American folk rock band Woods. It was released on May 22, 2020 under Woodsist.

Critical reception
Strange to Explain was met with "generally favorable" reviews from critics. At Metacritic, which assigns a weighted average rating out of 100 to reviews from mainstream publications, this release received an average score of 80, based on 11 reviews.

Track listing

References

2020 albums
Woods (band) albums
Woodsist albums